Se7en or SE7EN may refer to:

 Seven (1995 film), stylized as Se7en, 1995 American thriller film 
 Seven (comic book), stylized as SE7EN, 2008 comic book based on the film
 Se7en (born 1986), stage name of singer Sevyn Streeter while in the band RichGirl
 Seven (South Korean singer), stylized as Se7en (born 1984)
 David Gallegos, rapper and screamer of the crunk group Brokencyde
 Damien Broman Se7en, one of the stage names used by rapper Silver Bullet
Headshots: SE7EN, a 2005 remaster compilation album by the band Atmosphere

See also
7 (disambiguation), also includes Seven